Peter Moide (born 19 April 1974) is a Papua New Guinean cricketer who has played for the Papua New Guinea national cricket team in two tournaments - the 1998 ACC Trophy and the 2005 ICC Trophy, where he played his two List A matches.

References

1974 births
Living people
Papua New Guinean cricketers
Papua New Guinean sportsmen